Shkurinskaya is a rural locality (a stanitsa) in Kushchyovsky District of Krasnodar Krai, Russia. Population:

References

Rural localities in Krasnodar Krai